Maggie Chen (born Chen Wenjun on 24 September 1955) is a Hong Kong-born Chinese actress known for her role as Xiaoqing in the TV series New Legend of Madame White Snake and other roles in movies such as Supercop 2.

She is also a philanthropist, polyglot, an author, and a singer-songwriter. She has written and performed her own songs such as "Luo Min Ye" and the movie song "Qing Si Qian Wo Xin". She has written the books "Wo de Yeman Jimu" and "Yi Shuang Fei Wang Guangming de Chibang". She is proficient in Japanese, French, English, Cantonese, and Mandarin.

Outside the entertainment industry, she is known for her volunteer work and role as a public education figure. Because of her decades of charity work, she has become known as the "mother of angels."

She attended the University of Macau, graduating in 1987 with an MBA.  In 1999, she married a Chinese-American businessman named Xin Shangyong, and in 2008 they adopted a daughter from Shanxi named Lucia.

References 

Living people
1955 births
University of Macau alumni
20th-century Chinese actresses
21st-century Chinese actresses
Chinese philanthropists